Luca Pitti (1398–1472) was a Florentine banker during the period of the republic presided over by Cosimo de' Medici. He was awarded a knighthood, and received lavish presents from both the Signory of Firenze and the Medici family as a reward for helping maintain the government during the last years of Cosimo's rule when Cosimo was too old and feeble to maintain power alone.

As the head magistrate of Florence, known as "The Gonfalonier of Justice," he wielded great power and influence. In August, 1458, he staged a coup to seize control of Florentine government in the name of its existing ruler, the elderly and now frail Cosimo de' Medici. In effect he wished to strengthen the existing government, as a result many leading citizens were banished, and many other citizens were driven from power. The newly formed government was to last eight years with Cosimo as its figurehead, the reality being he was too frail to maintain power alone. Pitti's chief opponent at this time was Girolamo Machiavelli who was banished. However, he travelled the neighbouring principalities whipping up opposition to the new Florentine government. He was consequently declared a rebel, betrayed and returned to Florence where he mysteriously died in prison.

Pitti was then ennobled and very wealthy indeed, Niccolò Machiavelli in his History of Florence estimates no less a sum than twenty thousand ducats was presented to him.

It was then that he sought to rival the glory, if not power, of the Medici and began construction of the Palazzo Pitti intended to rival the palazzo of the Medici. He also began work on a villa at Rusciano. For the Palazzo Pitti, legend has it he "decided to employ the most brilliant architect of the times, whom he ordered to make the windows as big as the doors of the Medici residence and create an internal courtyard that was large enough to contain the whole of the Medici's palace on the Via Larga". This is almost certainly apocryphal as the architect Brunelleschi often credited with the design had been dead since twelve years. The true architect, often thought to be Luca Fancelli, was less well known at the time and the new palazzo, while awe inspiring, was not a true rival to the magnificence of the Medici residences. Machiavelli also states that Pitti would give sanctuary to any criminal within his walls if they could be of use in their building or decoration. Machiavelli also hints that Pitti's wealth was further increased by bribes and presents in return for favours. These allegations may or may not be true, one should remember that Machiavelli was not only opposed to the Medici himself, but also a kinsman of Pitti's arch enemy Girolamo Machiavelli who had been most likely murdered by the government which in effect Pitti controlled.

It has been said that Pitti wished to become first citizen and dictator himself. After the death of Cosimo in 1464, he conspired to overthrow and murder Piero di Cosimo de' Medici. He was pardoned by Piero after the failure of the plot and thereafter supported him.

Pitti's prosperity declined from 1464, following the death of Cosimo, his patron. Pitti died in 1472, work on his grand palazzo had stopped in 1465, and he was not to see it completed. However the family survived the upheaval following the overthrow of the Medici's power in 1494, and the tyrannical and puritanical rule of Girolamo Savonarola. Retaining some limited power and influence the family continued to reside at the Palazzo Pitti until finally in 1549 failing fortunes compelled Pitti's descendant Buonaccorso Pitti to sell the palazzo to the Grand Duchess of Tuscany, Eleanor, wife of Grand Duke Cosimo I who re-enforced, the restored but hitherto wavering, power of the Medici in Florence in 1537.

1398 births
1472 deaths
15th-century people of the Republic of Florence
15th-century Italian nobility
Italian bankers
Medieval bankers
15th-century Italian businesspeople
Businesspeople from Florence